is the collective name of several mobile phone-based games available only to Japanese NTT DoCoMo FOMA 900i cellphone users that often feature characters and story elements from the popular Tales role-playing video game series.  As these games are offered as a download-only phone service in Japan, none of them has been made available outside Japan.

Role-playing games

Tales of Tactics 
 is a tactical RPG similar to other turn-based tactical war games such as the Fire Emblem series. The game allows the player to take control of several characters from other Tales games and use their specific skills to battle enemies across several different boards.  Among the recruitable characters are Cless Alvein from Tales of Phantasia, Judas, Kyle, Reala, and Loni from Tales of Destiny 2, Lloyd from Tales of Symphonia and Stahn from Tales of Destiny.

In addition to the normal game, Tales of Tactics also features several additional features as downloadable content, such as a puzzle-based minigame, a picture and movie gallery from several games in the Tales series, and wallpapers. Also the newest release contains a playable demo for "Tales of Tales".

Tales of Breaker
 is modeled closely after the conventional games of the Tales series. It plays like a typical role-playing video game, with the player advancing the plot by fulfilling a number of tasks given by non-playable characters and defeating several monsters along the way. The game uses the familiar Linear Motion Battle System (LMBS) that is featured in several other games in the series, which involves the characters moving horizontally across the battlefield, striking enemies only when they are close enough, with all the action happening in real-time. The maximum battle party number is two characters. This is the first of three Tales mobile games that contain their own original stories and characters.

The story follows the adventures of a young girl named Mika, who, along with her companions Yuteki, Evelyn, Sauber, RuRu and Berger must travel the world in order to stop a rising evil from engulfing the land while slowly unraveling Mika's past.

Tales of Commons
 is a role-playing game that takes place in the world of Yupitel, and stars main characters Alvin and Sefina, along with their party members, Seiun and You. Like Tales of Breaker, it utilizes a variation of the Linear Motion Battle System. It was the first Tales of Mobile game to contain a theme song:  Kana Uemura's Kiseki. This is the second of the Tales mobile titles that have their own stories and characters. The character designs were by illustrator You Shiina.

During a perfectly ordinary journey, something very strange happened to a young man named Alvin, who was headed through a rainforest on the way to the hometown of his late mother. He suddenly hears singing from out of nowhere. He struggles on to the decayed ruins of a temple, and there he meets a young lady named Sefina, who is praying for something. Sephina is waiting for a natural Zilphixy (a small dragon-like being) to appear to her. In the past, a natural Zilphixy was created to fit a person upon their birth, but now a mechanical Zilphixy is used as a substitute. Sefina's wish is heard, and a Zilphixy appears in a flash of light. From there, Alvin and Sephina's story begins.

Tales of Wahrheit
 is a role-playing game similar to Tales of Breaker and Tales of Commons. "Wahrheit" is the German word for "truth". The main characters of the game are 16-year-old Seltz Vakstrum and Vila Czarheit, and they are accompanied by Blitz Vinte, Kalulu von Atmigar, Gamut, and Ray Sonne. A theme song by JAMOSA feat. CORN HEAD called Ienaiyo (Japanese for "I won't tell") accompanies the game. This is the last of the three Tales mobile titles with their own self-contained stories and characters. The character designs were by illustrator You Shiina.

There is also a separate game called Tales of Wahrheit Colosseum, which features tournament style battles using the Tales of Wahrheit battle system.

Other games
 Craymel Check Craymel Check features characters known as "Craymels" (beings with considerable magical skill featured in several games in the Tales series) in a number of small mini-games.  The artwork and character design of the craymels themselves are based on the ones from Tales of Eternia specifically.

Craymel LabCraymel Lab is a puzzle game that consists of the player moving falling blocks of different colors and shapes into an arrangement and making them disappear, similar in many ways to Tetris.  Several character choices are available before the game begins, all of them being from a previous Tales game.  Whichever character the player chooses determines what dialogue they will present as they play through the game's increasingly more difficult levels.

Groovy ArcheGroovy Arche is the same game featured in the PlayStation and PlayStation Portable remakes of Tales of Phantasia released only in Japan.  The player must control the character Arche as she flies across a horizontally scrolling screen, moving up and down as well as side to side firing bolts of magic energy at enemies to defeat them.  In each round, Arche can score more points by not only defeating a large number of monsters, but also by collecting several items that appear on the screen for a short amount of time.  The game is over whenever Arche's health, indicated by the life bar on the top of the screen, is depleted.

Klondike
The Tales of the Mobile take on the traditional card game Klondike, a game similar to Solitaire that can be played by only one person.  While playing the game, the Fairy character from Tales of Tactics offers her insight.

Mieu no Daibouken
 is an action role-playing game starring Mieu, the mascot of Tales of the Abyss.  A total of twelve dungeons are available to the player for download.

ReversiReversi is the Tales of Mobile version of the classic board game (also known as "Othello") that features characters from other Tales games playing against each other. Incidentally, Tales of Reversi, as part of a DVD special, was suggested as an actual game by Veigue Lungberg of Tales of Rebirth.

Scramble LandScramble Land is a card/board game that features characters from other Tales games playing against each other.

Tales of QuizTales of Quiz is a quiz game with questions given by characters the Tales universe. Includes monthly updated questions and a national ranking for the player to participate in.

Tales of Wonder CasinoTales of Wonder Casino''' features various minigames from casinos in the Tales series.

Whis Battle
Nearly identical to the minigame featured in Tales of Eternia, Whis Battle puts the player against other characters from that title in a card game.  Each character takes turns playing a card from their hand onto the table, and only cards of the same color may be placed on one another.  However, some cards are given two colors, and may be used to switch whichever card the next player must lay.  If a player is unable to place a card, they must draw cards until they can play.  The game ends when a player no longer has any cards in their hand.

In addition to featuring the Whis Card Game, the game is accompanied by several small story sequences involving characters from Tales of Eternia'' itself.

References

External links

Mobile, Tales of
Mobile games
Japan-exclusive video games
Video games developed in Japan

ja:テイルズオブタクティクス
ja:テイルズオブブレイカー
ja:テイルズオブコモンズ